Aphelia stigmatana is a species of moth of the family Tortricidae. It is found in Ukraine and the southern part of European Russia.

The wingspan is 22–32 mm.

References

Moths described in 1844
Aphelia (moth)
Moths of Europe